Choubeila Rached (1933 in Tunis – April 9, 2008) was a Tunisian singer. Her career started as part of The Rachidia. Rached was decorated with the insignia of the Order of the National Merit in the cultural sector by President Zine el Abidine Ben Ali.

Death
Rached died on April 9, 2008 in Tunis.

References

1933 births
2008 deaths
People from Tunis
20th-century Tunisian women singers